Civil Georgia is a Tbilisi-based free daily news website run by Georgian NGO UN Association of Georgia. It is supported by USAID, Friedrich Ebert Foundation and Swiss Agency for Development and Cooperation, the grants of which cover about 98% of the website's expenses. Founded in July 2001 and trilingual in Georgian, English, and Russian, it has since regularly published news stories and analytical articles on Georgia's political and social life. 

As of January 2009, Civil Georgia claims to reach 10,000 daily visitors.

In August 2008, Civil.ge was for a while put out of work during an attack by Russian hackers early in the Russo-Georgian war.

References

External links
  

Georgian news websites
Mass media in Tbilisi
Georgian-language websites
Internet in Georgia (country)